The Embassy of the United States in Islamabad is the diplomatic mission of the United States in Pakistan.  The embassy in Islamabad is one of the largest U.S. embassies in the world, in terms of personnel, and houses a chancery and complex of office buildings. The embassy complex also houses a contingent of military officials and intelligence personnel in addition to diplomatic and non-diplomatic staff. U.S. Department of State also maintains Consulates in Karachi, Lahore and Peshawar.

The American diplomatic mission is headed by Donald Blome, the Chargé d'affaires ad interim who has been overlooking the mission's objectives after the departure of David Hale in 2018. The first Embassy of the United States to Pakistan was located in the city of Karachi, then the capital of Pakistan. The embassy was relocated to Islamabad after the city was made the new capital in 1960, and rebuilt in 1979. In 2015, a new embassy complex was completed at a cost of $736 million.

History
The first U.S. embassy in Pakistan was established on August 15, 1947 in Karachi, then-capital of Pakistan. When the capital was moved to Islamabad in 1960, a new embassy was constructed there. After being burned to the ground by extremists in 1979, security at the rebuilt embassy was heightened. Security was again significantly increased in the wake of the September 11 attacks in 2001.

In 2011, the new complex began construction. On 9 August 2013, the United States State Department evacuated most diplomats and all non-emergency staff from the consulate in Lahore, and U.S. citizens were warned not to travel there due to terror concerns.

In August 2015, a new embassy complex was inaugurated in the Diplomatic Enclave which would house the embassy, replacing the previous building. The complex was built at a cost of $736 million, with $85 million invested into the local economy by the purchase of construction supply from Pakistan contractors and suppliers. The embassy is reported to be the one of the most expensive diplomatic missions of the United States, second only to the Embassy of the United States in Baghdad. The embassy was designed to accommodate a staff of 2,500 people.

Ambassador Paul W. Jones is currently the Chargé d'Affaires ad interim, as of September, 2018.

See also

 Americans in Pakistan
 Pakistan–United States relations
 1979 U.S. embassy burning in Islamabad
 Attacks on U.S consulate in Karachi
 April 2010 U.S consulate and ANP attack
Pakistan–United States military relations

Gallery

References

External links
Embassy of the United States in Islamabad
Visa Information For USA
Consulate General of the United States in Karachi
Consulate General of the United States in Lahore
Consulate General of the United States in Peshawar

Islamabad
Pakistan–United States relations
Buildings and structures in Islamabad
United States
United States
Rebuilt buildings and structures in Pakistan